Jony Muñoz (born November 8, 2001) is an American college soccer player who is the 2020 recipient of the Gatorade Boys' Soccer Player of the Year Award, a national honor recognizing the best high school soccer player in the United States. After graduating high school, Muñoz played two seasons of NCAA Division 1 soccer: one with Liberty University and one with University of Missouri–Kansas City.

Growing up, Muñoz played high school soccer for Olathe West High School and for the youth academy teams of Toca FC and Sporting Kansas City.

Career

High school and academy 
Muñoz played club soccer for Sporting Kansas City's Academy during his freshman and sophomore years of high school, before playing high school soccer for Olathe West during his junior and senior years. Muñoz, a devout Christian, said the choice was "a God-led decision", which helped him have a more balanced life. During his senior year of high school, Muñoz lead the Owls to a 20–1–0 record, and Kansas Class 6A State Championship, Olathe West's first ever state championship in a team sport. Muñoz played in all 21 matches, scoring 36 goals and dishing out 19 assists his senior year of high school. While in high school, Munoz also played club soccer for Toca FC in the Kansas City metropolitan area.

On June 17, 2020, Muñoz was awarded Gatorade Boys' Soccer Player of the Year Award for the top boys' soccer player in the country. He is the first soccer player from the state of Kansas to win the honor. He was also named the Gatorade Kansas Player of the Year (2020).

College 
Pending developments of the COVID-19 pandemic, Muñoz was scheduled to begin playing college soccer for Liberty University ahead of the 2020 NCAA Division I men's soccer season. However, Muñoz transferred to University of Missouri–Kansas City (UMKC) ahead of the spring portion of the 2020 season. During his freshman year with UMKC, Muñoz made fourteen appearances, scoring six times, earning third team Freshman All-American honors by College Soccer News.

Personal life 
Muñoz is a devout Christian and plays guitar in his church's worship band. With his church, he went on a week-long mission trip to Mexico.

Honors

Individual 
Gatorade Boys' Soccer National Player of the Year Award: 2020
Gatorade Kansas Player of the Year Award: 2020

Team 
Olathe West High School
 Kansas 6A Boys State High School Soccer Champions: 2019

References

External links 
 Jony Munoz at TopDrawer Soccer

2001 births
Living people
American expatriate sportspeople in Spain
American people of Mexican descent
Association football midfielders
Expatriate footballers in Spain
Sportspeople from Olathe, Kansas
People from Johnson County, Kansas
Soccer players from Kansas
Liberty Flames men's soccer players
Kansas City Roos men's soccer players
Kansas Republicans
American soccer players
Christians from Kansas